Ioannis (Yannis) C. Paschalidis (born 1968; Athens, Greece) is a professor at Boston University with appointments in Electrical and Computer Engineering, Systems Engineering, Biomedical Engineering, and Computing & Data Sciences. He serves as the Director of the Center for Information and Systems Engineering.

Biography 
Paschalidis received a diploma degree in Electrical Engineering from the National Technical University of Athens, Greece, in 1991, and an M.S. and Ph.D. in Electrical Engineering and Computer Science from the Massachusetts Institute of Technology (MIT) in 1993 and 1996, respectively. His doctoral thesis was on "Large Deviations in High-Speed Communication Networks" supervised by Dimitris Bertsimas and John Tsitsiklis. In September 1996, he joined the Boston University College of Engineering, where he has been ever since. He has held visiting appointments at Columbia University and MIT. His research interests lie in the fields of optimization, control, stochastic systems, machine learning, computational medicine, and computational biology. He has published a monograph and more than 220 refereed papers in these topics, and he has been the primary advisor to 26 Ph.D. theses.

Awards and honors 

 Founding Editor-in-Chief, IEEE Transactions on Control of Network Systems, 2013-2019. 
 Best Paper, Clinical Research Informatics, International Medical Informatics Association (IMIA), 2019. 
 Best Paper Award, Finalist, IEEE International Conference on Robotics and Automation (ICRA), 2016. 
 Invited participant, Keck Futures Initiative, National Academies, 2014. 
 Fellow of the Institute of Electrical and Electronics Engineers in 2014, "for contributions to the control and optimization of communication and sensor networks, manufacturing systems, and biological systems".
 Invited Participant, Frontiers of Engineering Symposium, National Academy of Engineering, 2002. 
 National Science Foundation CAREER Award, 2000. 
 George Nicholson Student Paper Competition by INFORMS, Second Place, 1997.

External links 
Publications and citations from Google Scholar.

Lab website.

References

1968 births
Living people
Greek computer scientists
Greek electrical engineers
MIT School of Engineering alumni
Boston University faculty
Fellow Members of the IEEE
Engineers from Athens